

Squads

Belize
Head coach:  Richard Orlowski

The final squad was revealed on 7 January 2017.

(N°4) Makonnan Clare DF 08/29/1994 NYIT Bears USA

Costa Rica
Head coach: Óscar Ramírez

The final squad was revealed on 2 January 2017.

El Salvador
Head coach:  Eduardo Lara

The final squad was revealed on 10 January 2017.
Caps and goals as of September 6, 2016 after the game against Canada.

Honduras
Head coach:  Jorge Luis Pinto

The final squad was revealed on 12 January 2017.
Caps and goals current as of November 15, 2016 after the match against Trinidad and Tobago.

Nicaragua
Head coach:  Henry Duarte

The final squad was revealed on 10 January 2017.
Caps and goals updated as of December 30, 2016 after the game against Trinidad and Tobago.

Panama
Head coach:  Hernán Darío Gómez

The final squad was revealed on 7 January 2017.

References

Copa Centroamericana squads
squads